Cenate Sotto is a comune (municipality) in the Province of Bergamo in the Italian region of Lombardy, located about  northeast of Milan and about  east of Bergamo.

The municipality of Cenate Sotto contains the frazioni (subdivisions, mainly villages and hamlets) Cascina Serbello, Tesolta, Quadra, Veneziane, and Brugaletti.

Cenate Sotto borders the following municipalities: Cenate Sopra, San Paolo d'Argon, Scanzorosciate, Trescore Balneario.

Demographic evolution

References

External links
 www.comune.cenatesotto.bg.it/